Conus lombardii is an extinct species of sea snail, a marine gastropod mollusk in the family Conidae, the cone snails, cone shells or cones.

Description
The size of the shell attains 29.5 mm. It is similar to Conus kaesleri and Conus spurius

Distribution
This marine species of cone snail is known only in the fossil state in the Neogene of the Dominican Republic.

References

 Hendricks J.R. (2015). Glowing seashells: diversity of fossilized coloration patterns on coral reef-associated cone snail (Gastropoda: Conidae) shells from the Neogene of the Dominican Republic. PLoS ONE. 10(4): e0120924

External links
 World Register of Marine Species

lombardii
Fossil taxa described in 2015